The Almanzora River is a river in the province of Almería in Andalusia, Spain.

The Almanzora river rises on the northern slope of the Sierra de Los Filabres on the border between the provinces of Granada and Almeria.

Sometimes it becomes swollen as in September 2012. A previous flood occurred in October 1973.

To the south, neighboring watersheds are those of Andarax River (via the Nacimiento River and the Rambla de Tabernas ), the Rio de Aguas and Antas river.

To the west, adjoining watersheds is that of the Guadalquivir (via the Rio de Baza and rio Guardal joining the Guadalquivir river Guadiana Menor via rio).

Toward the north and east, the watershed is that of Segura (via the rambla de Chirivel and rio Guadalentin).

The Ancient Romans called it the Surbo, from Latin flumen superbum, "superb river", for its terrible floods. Its present name derives from the Arabic al-Mansura (المنصورة), "place of victory".

Rivers of Spain
Rivers of Andalusia
Geography of the Province of Almería